The 1999–2000 Tulsa Golden Hurricane men's basketball team represented the University of Tulsa as a member of the Western Athletic Conference in the 1999–2000 college basketball season. The Golden Hurricane played their home games at the Reynolds Center. Led by head coach Bill Self, they finished the season 32–5 overall and 12–2 in conference play to finish atop the WAC standings. After losing in the championship game of the 2000 WAC men's basketball tournament, the team defeated UNLV, #7 Cincinnati, and #23 Miami (FL) to reach the Elite Eight of the NCAA tournament, before falling to North Carolina in the South Regional Final.

Roster

Schedule and results

|-
!colspan=9 style=| Regular Season

|-
!colspan=9 style=| WAC Tournament

|-
!colspan=9 style=| NCAA Tournament

Rankings

^Coaches did not release a Week 1 poll.
*AP did not release post-NCAA Tournament rankings

Awards and honors
Bill Self – WAC Coach of the Year

References

Tulsa Golden Hurricane men's basketball seasons
Tulsa
Tulsa Golden Hurricane men's b
Tulsa Golden Hurricane men's b
Tulsa